Michal Peňaška (born 30 August 1986) is a professional Slovak football striker.

Career
He made his debut for FK Dukla Banská Bystrica against MŠK Žilina on 2 March 2013, scoring the only goal in a 1 - 0 win at Žilina.

References

External links
FK Dukla profile
Corgoň Liga profile

Eurofotbal profile

1986 births
Living people
Slovak footballers
Association football forwards
ŠK Senec players
FK Dukla Banská Bystrica players
Spartak Myjava players
Slovak Super Liga players
Sportspeople from Malacky